Alan Edwards may refer to:
 Alan Edwards (actor) (1925–2003), British-Australian actor
 Alan Edwards (canoeist) (1943–2002), British Olympic sprint canoer
 Alan Edwards (rugby) (fl. 1930s), Welsh rugby union and rugby league footballer
 Alan Edwards (diplomat), Australian High Commissioner to Vanuatu from 1996 to 1999

See also
Allan Edwards (disambiguation)
Allen Edwards (disambiguation)
Al Edwards (disambiguation)